Volker Beck (born 30 June 1956 in Nordhausen, Bezirk Erfurt) is a former East German athlete, winner of 400 m hurdles at the 1980 Summer Olympics.

With the best 400 m hurdler in the late 1970s and early 1980s Edwin Moses missing due to the boycott, the most likely winner of the Olympic gold was Volker Beck, the East German 400 m hurdles champion in 1980, 1981 and 1983.

In Moscow, Beck won the 400 m hurdles in 48,70 s, beating second-placed Vasyl Arkhypenko from Soviet Union by 0.16 seconds, although it was the slowest Olympic final since 1964. Beck won his second Olympic medal in 4 × 400 m relay, when he was beaten to a second place by Soviet anchor Viktor Markin.

After his athletics career, Beck started to work as a coach, among other things he was a coach of German National Team.

References
 profile

1956 births
Living people
People from Nordhausen, Thuringia
People from Bezirk Erfurt
East German male sprinters
East German male hurdlers
Sportspeople from Thuringia
German athletics coaches
Olympic athletes of East Germany
Athletes (track and field) at the 1980 Summer Olympics
Olympic gold medalists for East Germany
Olympic silver medalists for East Germany
Medalists at the 1980 Summer Olympics
Olympic gold medalists in athletics (track and field)
Olympic silver medalists in athletics (track and field)
Recipients of the Patriotic Order of Merit in silver